Bar-Giora was a Jewish militia of the Second Aliyah, the precursor of Hashomer.

History 

Bar Giora's founder, Israel Shochat made his Aliyah to Ottoman Palestine in 1904. He already had experience of underground militias during the Tzarist pogroms and on his arrival he came under the influence of Michael Halperin, attracted by his talk of an army of Jewish fighters. Shochat established a small group of loyal followers and in 1906 launched the local branch of Poale Zion with about 60 members. In 1907 Yitzhak Ben-Zvi arrived from Poltava; as leader of Russian Poale Zion he had been on the run from the secret police for a year. Shochat and Ben-Ziv travelled together to the 8th World Zionist Congress in The Hague and on their return established the first incarnation of Bar Giora.

On September 28, 1907, a group met in Ben-Zvi's Jaffa room: Israel Shochat, Yitzhak Ben-Zvi, Alexander Zeid, Mendel Portugali, Israel Giladi, Yehezkel Hankin, Yehezkel Nissanov and Moshe Givoni. They swore themselves to absolute secrecy - on pain of death ("death by snake bite" i.e. sudden execution) - and absolute allegiance to their leader, Israel Shochat. The name was chosen after Simon Bar Giora, one of the leaders of the Jewish Revolt against the Romans. As a motto, they chose a line from Yaakov Cohen's poem, Habiryonim: "In fire and blood did Judea fall; in blood and fire Judea shall rise."
The group's objective was to create an underground army, preparing for armed insurrection and the creation of a Jewish State. Their tactics were to act as a command cell and organise groups that could be manipulated towards the ultimate objective. They would focus on replacing Arab guards in the remote colonies in Upper Galilee and set up their own outposts. A team of shepherds was to undertake a detailed survey of the land.
The following month Shochat led an expanded group to Sejera leaving Ben-Zvi in Jaffa as their man inside Poale Zion.

When Hashomer was formed on April 12, 1909, Bar-Giora was absorbed into it.
David Ben Gurion was not included and this influenced his dealings with Hashomer.

See also
 Hashomer Museum
 Kfar Giladi

References

External links 
 A brief history

Zionist organizations
Militant Zionist groups
Organizations established in 1907
Organizations disestablished in 1909
1907 establishments in Ottoman Syria
1909 disestablishments in the Ottoman Empire